Li Tiefu (October 1869 – 16 June 1952) was a Chinese painter, sculptor, calligrapher and revolutionary, known for introducing western oil painting to China and for assisting Sun Yat-sen in funding the Xinhai revolution and overthrowing the Qing Dynasty. During his time in New York, he was a member of the National Academy of Design (now known as the National Academy Museum and School). Li Tiefu was hailed as one of the most important Cantonese artists of the 20th century at the Guangdong Art Centennial Exhibition.

Gallery

References

1869 births
1952 deaths
20th-century Chinese painters
Chinese sculptors
Republic of China painters
People's Republic of China painters
Painters from Guangdong
People from Heshan
Chinese art educators